Palmdale is an unincorporated community in Shafer Township, Chisago County, Minnesota, United States.

The community is located north of Taylors Falls at the junction of State Highway 95 (MN 95) and 350th Street.  Dry Creek flows through the community.  Nearby places include Taylors Falls, Shafer, Center City, Almelund, North Branch, and Wild Mountain Ski Recreation Area.

ZIP codes 55084 (Taylors Falls) and 55074 (Shafer) intersect near Palmdale.

References

Unincorporated communities in Minnesota
Unincorporated communities in Chisago County, Minnesota